Kristi Hoss Schiller is an American Quarter Horse owner and breeder, businesswoman, socialite, and philanthropist from Houston, Texas. Schiller is the founder and chairman of K9s4COPs, a 501(c)(3) foundation that provides police dogs to law enforcement agencies.

Early life 

Schiller was born Kristi Kay Hoss to Eric Roger Hoss  and Jo Ann Dupnik and grew up in Freeport, Texas. She attended the University of Houston and graduated with a bachelor's degree in broadcast journalism. In 1987, she served on the board of the Brazoria County Youth Home.

Career 

After college, Schiller modeled for Playboy magazine and went on to become an entertainment reporter on the radio. As of 1992 she presented a program as "Lucy Lipps  - the skirt with the dirt" on the radio station KLOL on "The Stevens and Pruett Show." Schiller later went on to host her own morning show, "Cruze with Lucy" on KTBZ -The Buzz. She then moved to television. She was hired on the CBS Syndicated show Day and Date, and also found work on the E! Channel and Hard Copy. In 1993, she launched an entertainment based website, and in 1997 Forbes dubbed Schiller "Queen of the Internet."

K9s4COPs 

In June 2010, Schiller founded K9s4COPs after seeing a Houston area news story of a K9 being killed in the line of duty, after chasing down burglary suspects. K9s4COPs is a 501(c)(3) nonprofit foundation dedicated to providing K9s, trained and ready for action, to law enforcement agencies and school districts in need. Schiller's husband John Schiller is also a supporter of K9s4COPs. Together they hosted the foundation's first fundraiser in 2011 at their home in River Oaks to help get donations for the nonprofit.

K9s4KIDs is an initiative of K9s4COPs, aiming to benefit school districts and college campus police departments with trained K9s. Schiller thought of K9s4KIDs as a result of recent school shootings and the suggestion for police dogs as a solution. The idea was that dogs would help out in situations were there is a lack of campus security.

K9s4Cops was included as an entrant in the 125th Rose Parade in Pasadena, Calif. on January 1, 2014.

Kristi was featured on "The Steve Harvey Show" as one of Harvey's Heroes on April 23, 2015.

Diamonds & Dirt Barrel Horse Classic 

In 2011, Schiller founded Diamonds & Dirt Barrel Horse Classic Together they came up with the idea for DDBHC and Schiller tied the nonprofit, K9s4COPs, into the event. (03:27) 

In its first year, Diamonds & Dirt drew contestants from 30 states, Brazil, Canada and Mexico and gave away more than $300,000 in prize money. DDBHC currently has the largest futurity purse in Texas with over 2,000 runs and champion riders including Brittany Pozzi. The proceeds of Diamonds & Dirt are donated to K9s4COPs.

In 2013 the Diamonds & Dirt Barrel Horse Classic was held at the Brazos County Expo Center. Schiller arranged sponsorship by the event for K9s4COPs and proceeds from A Night of Diamonds were able to benefit the nonprofit organization.

In 2019 the 8th annual DDBHC will be held in Bryan, Texas, April 1–7, 2019.

Personal life 

Schiller met her husband, energy executive John D. Schiller in the summer of 2001 while she was living in New Orleans. She moved back to Houston and in the spring of 2002 the two were engaged.
Together the Schillers have one daughter, Sinclair Schiller, and John has two children from a previous marriage, Daniel and Hailey.

Honors and awards 
In 2013 she received Harris County Sheriff's Department's Peace Officers Award in 2013 for her work with K9s4COPs. Schiller received the Humanitarian Service Award presented to her for her donation of three trained K9s to the Houston Police Department. In 2013, Schiller was presented with The Leon Goldstein award given to an individual who has made a significant contribution to fighting crime in the Houston Area.

Organizations 

As a board member of the Brazoria County Youth Home, Schiller launched a toy drive benefiting children who had not yet found a foster home during the holidays and birthdays.

Schiller was named one of ABC 13's "Women of Distinction" in 2011, for her impact in the community and her service on a number of community boards, including the Contemporary Arts Museum, The Children's Museum of Houston and as a trustee for the Houston Ballet and the Houston Council for Alcohol and Drugs.
She has helped with events including the Opera Ball, The Houston Humane Society Gala, the Nutcracker Market and Habitat for Humanity.
Schiller also hosts the K9s4COPs charity softball tournament in Houston which also benefits K9s4KIDs.

References

External links
"Meet the founder" on K9s4COP's homepage
http://diamondsanddirt.com/about-us

Businesspeople from Texas
People from Freeport, Texas
People from Houston
University of Houston alumni
1970 births
Living people